Marginocystiscus is an extinct genus of sea snails, marine gastropod mollusks, in the family Cystiscidae.

Species
Species within the genus Marginocystiscus include:
†Marginocystiscus subtilplicatus Landau, da Silva & Heitz, 2016

References

 
Gastropods described in 2016
Monotypic gastropod genera
Cystiscidae